Venom (also known as The Legend of Spider Forest, and Spider's Venom) is a 1971 British horror film directed by Peter Sykes in his directorial debut.

Plot

A Nazi scientist and a woman known as a "spider goddess" attempt to develop a nerve gas made from spider venom.

Cast
Simon Brent as Paul Greville
Neda Arnerić as Anna
Sheila Allen as Ellen
Derek Newark as Johann
Terence Soall as Lutgermann
Gerard Heinz as Huber
Gertan Klauber as Kurt
Sean Gerrad as Rudi
Bette Vivian as Frau Kessler
Ray Barron as Young Man
Billy Reid as Gang member
George Fisher as Gang member
Nosher Powell as Gang member

Release

Home media
The film was released on DVD by Cav Distributing Corporation on Jan. 31, 2006, as a part of a double-feature alongside God Told Me To. It was later released by W Video on May 2, 2017 under its alternate name Spider's Venom.

Reception

Time Out London gave the film a mixed review, criticizing the film's script as being "full of holes", but commended the film's "tautly visual" action, and imaginative direction. Dave Sindelar of Fantastic Movie Musings and Ramblings gave the film a negative review, criticizing the film's confusing plot, "jagged" direction, and poor camerawork.

References

External links
 
 
 

1971 films
1971 horror films
1971 independent films
British horror films
British independent films
Films shot in England
Films about Nazis
1971 directorial debut films
1970s English-language films
Films directed by Peter Sykes
1970s British films